The Prime Gig is a 2000 film directed by Gregory Mosher, starring Vince Vaughn, Julia Ormond, and Ed Harris. The Prime Gig debuted at the Venice, London, and Los Angeles film festivals, and was released directly to DVD in September 2001.

Plot

Pendleton "Penny" Wise, a talented telemarketer who can sell almost anything over the phone, makes a fine living doing phone sales until the company that employs him goes bankrupt. Penny is approached by Caitlin Carlson, who is hiring telephone salesmen for Kelly Grant, a legend in telemarketing, but Penny is unsure if Grant's latest venture, selling shares in a gold mine, is legitimate.

Cast
 Vince Vaughn as Pendelton "Penny" Wise
 Julia Ormond as Caitlin Carlson
 Ed Harris as Kelly Grant
 Rory Cochrane as Joel
 Wallace Shawn as Gene
 Stephen Tobolowsky as Mick
 George Wendt as Archie
 Jeannetta Arnette as Cheryl
 Shishir Kurup as Sujat
 Harper Roisman as Harry
 J.J. Johnston as Lloyd
 Tom Wright as Marvin Sanders
 Romany Malco as Zeke
 Brian George as Nasser
 Amber Benson as Batgirl

References

External links
 
 

2000 films
2000 drama films
American drama films
2000s English-language films
2000s American films